The Dee Glen Smith Spectrum is a 10,270-seat multi-purpose arena in the western United States, located on the campus of Utah State University in Logan, Utah. Best known as the home of the Utah State Aggies men's and the women's basketball teams, it also hosts gymnastics, volleyball, and other sporting events.

In addition to sporting events, the Smith Spectrum is utilized for concerts, commencement ceremonies, and other special events central to the Cache Valley community.

It became known as the Spectrum within the next year, and was named for Dee Glen Smith, founder of Smith's Food and Drug, whose contribution funded a 1988 renovation that added new offices for the athletics department and ticket office.

USU Men's Basketball

Since the Spectrum's inaugural 1970-1971 season, through the 2018–19 season, the Aggies are a combined  at home.

In December 2005, the Utah State Aggies played their 500th game in the Spectrum.  In those games, USU amassed a dominating record of 398 wins and 102 losses versus its competition.

Large crowds are another characteristic of the arena, as the Aggies have averaged better than 7,000 fans per game in 38 of their 42 seasons in the Smith Spectrum, and have averaged better than 8,500 fans per game every year since the 2007–08 season. A large part of the home court advantage comes from the USU student section, known as The Hurd.

On March 1, 1990, two former Utah State students set off a water bomb that soaked UNLV coach Jerry Tarkanian and other UNLV coaches and players with a blue-green dye. UNLV was awarded two technical free throws and made both of them. UNLV won the game by two points, 84–82.

Stew Morrill Era

At the end of the 2008–09 season, Utah State held the second-longest home winning streak in the NCAA, having won 34 straight home games. The Aggies finished the 2007–08 season as well as the 2008–09 season with undefeated marks at home.

Records at the Spectrum

Overall: 

Stew Morrill era (1998–2015): 

Craig Smith era (2018–2021): 

Undefeated seasons (6): 1973–74 (14–0), 1997–98 (15–0), 2000–01 (15–0), 2007–08 (17–0), 2008–09 (17–0), 2010–11 (17–0)

Longest win streak: 37 (November 2007 – December 2009)

See also
 List of NCAA Division I basketball arenas

References

External links
Utah State University Athletics – Dee Glen Smith Spectrum

College basketball venues in the United States
Indoor arenas in Utah
Basketball venues in Utah
Utah State Aggies basketball
Sports venues in Cache County, Utah
Sports venues completed in 1970
1970 establishments in Utah
College volleyball venues in the United States
College gymnastics venues in the United States